Xyphosia punctigera is a species of tephritid or fruit flies in the genus Xyphosia of the family Tephritidae.

Distribution
Russia, Korea, Japan.

References

Tephritinae
Insects described in 1898
Diptera of Asia